Robert Webb (born 1972) is an English comedian, actor and writer.

Robert Webb may also refer to:
 Robert Webb (MP) (c. 1719–1765), English politician and merchant
 Robert Webb (cricketer, born 1806) (1806–1880), English cricketer
 Robert Webb (Kent cricketer) (1840–?), English cricketer
 Bob Webb (cricketer) (1917-1989), New Zealand cricketer
 Robert D. Webb (1903–1990), American film maker
 Robert I. Webb, professor at the University of Virginia
 Robert G. Webb (born 1927), zoologist at the University of Texas, El Paso
 Robert Rumsey Webb (1850–1936), mathematics coach in Cambridge, England
 Robert Wallace Webb (1909–1984), American geologist
 Bobby Webb (born 1933), English footballer
 Robert Webb, creator of polyhedra software Stella
 Robert K. Webb (1922–2012), American historian